Pamela K. Long is an American writer and executive producer. Long won several Emmys for her work on CBS soap opera Guiding Light from 1983 to 1990. She was also writer and executive producer on the NBC film Dolly Parton's Coat of Many Colors.

Career 
Before writing and acting, Long won the title of Miss Alabama in 1974 and competed for the title of Miss America 1975. At the time, she was attending the University of North Alabama, and was involved in the Phi Mu sorority.

After graduation, she moved to New York City and landed the role of Ashley Linden on Texas from 1981 to 1982. She began writing scripts for the show while she was still part of the cast, and in 1982, Long was named head writer of Texas. The show began to improve in quality, but the ratings in the U.S. remained low. However, in Canada, Texas topped the daytime ratings charts for many weeks. The last episode of Texas aired on December 31, 1982.

In March 1983, Long became head writer of CBS Daytime's Guiding Light, and Gail Kobe, Long's former executive producer at Texas, joined the show in the same role.

Long created several key characters on Guiding Light, including vixen Reva Shayne, complicated Alexandra Spaulding, and rough-around-the-edges ingenue Harley Davidson Cooper. Long left her role as head writer in 1985, but returned for a second stint from 1987 to 1990. She had stints as head writer for several other daytime soap operas during her career. 

Long was creator and executive producer of the prime-time drama Second Noah for ABC, for which she won the Child Advocate Award. She also wrote and produced the critically acclaimed Christy for CBS, winning the Templeton Prize. Numerous pilot developments, TV movies and a feature film followed, as well as writing and producing the first scripted drama series for MTV Undressed with Roland Joffe.

Long was named lead consultant for the launch of all of MTV's scripted dramas, and was executive producer and head writer for PAX's Twice in a Lifetime, winning multiple Gemini nominations, including best drama.

In 2015, Long was writer and executive producer of the film Dolly Parton's Coat of Many Colors which garnered over 15 million viewers its first showing, NBC's highest ratings for a film in seven years.

Personal life
Long was once married to actor Jay Hammer and was credited for a time as Pamela Long Hammer. They have two sons together.

Positions held
Guiding Light
Head Writer: March 1983 to November 1985, July 1987 to December 1990
Co-Head Writer: December 1985 to January 1986

One Life to Live 
Head Writer: March 1998 to December 1998 

Santa Barbara
Head Writer: February 1992 to January  1993

Search for Tomorrow 
Executive Story Consultant: May 1986 to December  1986 ; 

Texas
Actress: February  1981 to December  1982
Head and Script Writer: October 1982 to December 1982

Her Hidden Truth
Script Writer: November  1995
Producer: November  1995

Second Noah
Producer

Awards and nominations
Daytime Emmy Awards

 Wins: 1986 & 1990, Best Writing, Guiding Light
 Nominations: 1985 & 1989, Best Writing, Guiding Light

Writers Guild of America Award
 Nominations: 1985 & 1989 seasons, Guiding Light; 1993 season, Santa Barbara

References

External links
Miss Alabama official website

Clips from Texas episodes

Writing history

|-

|-

|-

|-

|-

1950s births
Living people
American soap opera writers
Daytime Emmy Award winners
Miss Alabama winners
Miss America 1975 delegates
University of North Alabama alumni
Women soap opera writers
Screenwriters from Alabama
Place of birth missing (living people)